No is a village located in the Ringkøbing-Skjern Municipality, in the Central Denmark Region.

See also
List of short place names

References 

Cities and towns in the Central Denmark Region
Ringkøbing-Skjern Municipality